Smithfield is a street with a length of approximately 1,300 m in Kennedy Town, Hong Kong Island, Hong Kong. Its northern section is a commercial and residential area, while its southern section is a road connecting it to Pok Fu Lam Road. Smithfield was historically the site of a cattle quarantine depot and a slaughterhouse, and was probably named after its London namesake.

Location
The street begins at New Praya, Kennedy Town at the Victoria Harbour shore of the town, at Belcher Bay, and extends south into Mount Davis. It crosses two of the main streets of Kennedy Town: Catchick Street and Belcher's Street. To the south, Smithfield forms T-shaped intersections with Rock Hill Street, Forbes Street, Pokfield Road, Lung Wah Street. It ends at a junction with Pok Fu Lam Road and Mount Davis Road.

Features
 Smithfield Municipal Services Building, located at 12K Smithfield. It houses the Smithfield Sports Centre, Smithfield Market and Smithfield Public Library. The fourth floor houses a study corner for school students. The entrances for the different activities are separated and the market is segregated from the library and the indoor games hall.
 Kennedy Town station of the MTR, opened on 28 December 2014
 Kwun Lung Lau, one of the first public housing developments in Hong Kong, built in 1967
 Kennedy Town Fire Station, located at the northern end of Smithfield, at the corner with New Praya, Kennedy Town.
 Forbes Street Temporary Playground, located at the junction of Forbes Street and Smithfield 
 (former) Kennedy Town Swimming Pool, at 12N Smithfield. It was demolished to facilitate the construction of Kennedy Town station.

History

Cattle depot
The area bound by the present day Rock Hill Street and Pokfield Path was historically the site of a cattle quarantine depot and a slaughterhouse to house and slaughter live cattle when the animals first arrived in Hong Kong via the piers in Kennedy Town. The Kennedy Town Slaughterhouse was established in 1894.

Smithfield was an area frequented by people who worked as labourers at the cattle station, and the marketplaces nearby that have since become the Forbes Street Temporary Playground and the North Street red minibus terminus, and for the loading and unloading of sea cargo coming in and out of the piers of Kennedy Town.

The British novelist Martin Booth wrote in his 2004 autobiographical Gweilo: Memories of a Hong Kong Childhood: "the bellow of a cow in the Kennedy Town abattoir might lift up to me – to be abruptly cut short".

In 1961, the government decided that the slaughterhouse was to be relocated to the Kennedy Town Abattoir at Cadogan Street, and it moved in 1968. Despite calls to convert the original slaughterhouse site into a swimming pool, the government said in 1969 that the plan was not feasible until both the cattle depot and the former slaughterhouse complex (then occupied by the cattle depot as well) were released for redevelopment. The cattle depot was closed down in 1986, when the government finally decided that it was to be removed. The land was subsequently developed into the Kennedy Town Swimming Pool (now demolished), Smithfield Market and the Smithfield Municipal Services Building.

An abattoir and pig depot existed on the other south west side of Smithfield from the late 19th century until at least 1970.

Air raid tunnel
At the time of the Battle of Hong Kong in 1941, Smithfield was the site of the No. 9 Air Raid Tunnel.

Gasometer
Following the fire at the gasometer in Shek Tong Tsui (formerly known as West Point), the Hong Kong and China Gas Company had by 1936 purchased an area of land situated to the south of the cattle depot and erected a gasometer to replace the former gasometer at West Point. The gasometer was in existence until the early 1980s when it was demolished to make way for the construction of Smithfield Terrace by Henderson Land Development Co. Ltd, the largest shareholder of Hong Kong and China Gas Company.

Municipal Services Building
Smithfield Municipal Services Building was completed in 1995, and was then called "The Urban Council Smithfield Complex". The Smithfield Sports Centre inside the building opened in July 1996. The market within the building opened in June 1996. It is divided into three parts, each occupying a separate floor: meat and wet fish market, fruit and vegetable market, cooked food stalls. These retail outlets were previously located in the surrounding streets of Kennedy Town, including the longstanding Smithfield Road Temporary Market, which was a licensed food market, and illegal hawkers at the junction of Smithfield and Belcher's Street.

Extension
Until the mid-1990s, Smithfield was a dead end street at the top end with Wah Fai House, Mei Wah Mansion and Smithfield Garden, which are to the south of the Lung Wah Street junction, marking the end of the street. However, record of the Lands Department shows that Ho Chong (何莊; lit. "Farmstead of the Ho family"), a Hotung ancestral family property situated at the hillside beyond the top end of the street, is given the address of "40A Smithfield" and should thus be treated technically as the original top end of Smithfield.

Later the soil on the hillside behind Wah Fai House and Mei Wah Mansion was removed, and a vehicle link between Smithfield and Pok Fu Lam Road was constructed. The link was opened to vehicles in early 1998 and is now known as Smithfield Extension, to be distinguished from the original top end of the street adjacent to Lung Wah Street.

Name
Smithfield is one of the few streets in Hong Kong without the use of words such as "Road", "Street", "Path", "Lane" etc. Other notable examples are Queensway in Admiralty, Broadway in Mei Foo and Glenealy in Mid-Levels.

London namesake
Smithfield, Hong Kong, was probably named after its London namesake by the British colonial administration. Smithfield, London, is an area in the north-western part of the City of London with a history of over 800 years. It started as an area to house live cattle from the country before they were slaughtered and sold at the meat markets in the City of London. The area was frequented by people of the grassroots of society who worked there as labourers and traders of meat and other foodstuff in the marketplaces nearby. Though situated in England, Smithfield, London, has been a symbol of Scottish patriotism after William Wallace was executed there in 1305. Smithfield, London, as a landmark was promoted by literary works such as Charles Dickens' Oliver Twist and Mark Twain's The Prince and the Pauper.

The old cattle stations in both Smithfield, London and Smithfield, Hong Kong have ceased to exist and the locations were both replaced by a market. Both areas have since been redeveloped to accommodate middle class residents.

Name change
The street is often mistakenly written as Smithfield Road by local residents, affected by the Chinese suffix  (lo, lit. road) and in Chinese,  was often mistaken as  too.

On 2 February 2007, the Lands Department proposed to rename Smithfield as Smithfield Road. However, the idea to add the word "Road" was opposed on the ground that the street name was unique in that it was named after and had a similar historical development as Smithfield, London. The name change became official on 14 December 2007.

Transportation

Smithfield is served by trams, buses and minibuses. The Kennedy Town station of the MTR rapid transit railway opened to the public on 28 December 2014. It is located under Smithfield, the former Kennedy Town Swimming Pool and the Forbes Street Temporary Playground. The station has two exits on Smithfield: "A" on the east side connected to a green minibus terminus, and "C" on the west side next to the playground.

Green minibus routes 12, 13, and 23 use and stop on Smithfield.

A Green Mini Bus terminus is on Smithfield adjacent to the MTR exit A. Routes 58 and 59 were relocated from North Street on 25 December 2014, and route 58M started operating at 7am 29 December 2014. The new terminus includes a stop for GMB route 58A to Aberdeen, Hong Kong.

Bus route 43X used to use Smithfield to move between Pok Fu Lam Road and Kennedy Town. This route has a bus stop named "Kennedy Town Swimming Pool" despite its demolition to make way for the MTR station. It has since been canceled.

In the 1990s, road traffic in Smithfield was considered as "extremely heavy throughout the day", and as a consequence, the vehicular entrance of the Smithfield Municipal Services Building (completed in 1995) was assigned to the Rock Hill Street.

Intersections

Two-way road section

Listed from south to north.

One-way road section
Listed from north to south.

See also
 List of streets and roads in Hong Kong
 Sheung Shui Slaughterhouse
Other places named "Smithfield (disambiguation)"
With origin as a marketplace:
Smithfield, London, United Kingdom (sometimes referred to as West Smithfield)
Smithfield, Birmingham, United Kingdom
Smithfield, Dublin, Ireland
As a thoroughfare (i.e., a road or street):
East Smithfield, London, United Kingdom

References

External links

Google Maps of Smithfield

Kennedy Town
Roads on Hong Kong Island